Alexander Vladimirovich Samarin (born 15 June 1998) is a Russian figure skater. He is the 2019 European silver medalist, the 2019 Internationaux de France silver medalist, the 2017 Skate Canada International bronze medalist, the 2018 Internationaux de France bronze medalist, and a four-time 2017 Russian national medalist (silver in 2017 and 2018, bronze in 2019, bronze in 2020). He has won three medals on the ISU Challenger Series, including gold at the 2015 CS Warsaw Cup.

As a junior, Samarin won bronze at the 2017 World Junior Championships and silver at the 2016–17 Junior Grand Prix Final, in addition to three gold medals on the ISU Junior Grand Prix series.

Samarin currently holds the world record for the  highest scored element in single figure skating (21.12 points for a 4Lz+3T combination at the 2019 Rostelecom Cup) since the introduction of the -5/+5 GOE system in 2018.

Personal life
Alexander Vladimirovich Samarin was born on 15 June 1998 in Moscow.

Career

Early years
Samarin began skating in 2002. His very first coach was Lyubov Fedorchenko at the Young Pioneers Stadium. In 2006, he switched to CSKA Moscow, where he was coached by Inna Goncharenko. In the 2009–10 season, he won the novice event at the 2010 NRW Trophy in Dortmund, Germany, and the junior silver medal at the International Crystal Skate 2010 in Odintsovo, Russia. In 2011–12, he withdrew from the 2012 Russian Junior Championships due to illness.

2012–13 season
In 2012–13, Samarin underwent eye surgery because of a detached retina at the start of the season. Debuting on the ISU Junior Grand Prix (JGP) series, he won a pair of bronze medals at JGP events in Slovenia and Germany and became the first alternate for the 2012–13 Junior Grand Prix Final. At the Russian Championships, he finished eighth in his first senior appearance and then won the silver medal on the junior level. He was assigned to the 2013 World Junior Championships, where he finished eighth.

2013–14 season
In 2013–14, Samarin was assigned to one JGP event in Belarus and finished fourth. At the 2014 Russian Championships, he placed thirteenth in seniors, landing his first triple Axel in competition in the free skate and then fourth at the junior level. Goncharenko coached him until the end of the season.

2014–15 season
Samarin changed coaches ahead of the 2014–15 season, joining Elena Buianova and Svetlana Sokolovskaya. He won bronze at his first Junior Grand Prix event of the season, in Courchevel, France, and then silver in Ostrava, Czech Republic. Making his senior international debut, he took silver in November at the 2014 Ice Challenge, an ISU Challenger Series (CS) competition in Graz, Austria, and finished eighth the following month at another CS event, the 2014 Golden Spin of Zagreb. Nationally, he finished eleventh on the senior level and second on the junior level. Concluding his season, he placed sixth in the short, ninth in the free, and eleventh overall at the 2015 World Junior Championships in Tallinn, Estonia.

2015–16 season
Competing in the 2015–16 JGP series, Samarin finished fourth in Slovakia and won gold in Croatia. He appeared at two CS events, placing fourth at the 2015 Mordovian Ornament and winning the 2015 Warsaw Cup. At Russian nationals, he ranked eighth on the senior level and won the silver medal as a junior, behind Dmitri Aliev. He finished fourth at the 2016 World Junior Championships in Debrecen after winning a small silver medal for the short program and placing fifth in the free skate.

2016–17 season
Competing in the 2016–17 JGP series, Samarin won gold medals in Saransk, Russia, and Tallinn, Estonia. His medals qualified him to the 2016–17 Junior Grand Prix Final in Marseille.  He competed at the senior level and won gold at the Volvo Open Cup in November.  In December, he won silver in France, having finished second to Dmitri Aliev, and then took silver at the 2017 Russian Championships, behind Mikhail Kolyada.

In January 2017, Samarin competed at the 2017 European Championships, where he placed eighth.  In March 2017, Samarin competed at the 2017 Junior Worlds, where he won the bronze medal after placing third in the short program and fourth in the free skate.

2017–18 season
Handicapped by an injury to his right foot, Samarin was off the ice for about four months and returned to full training beginning of September. In October 2017, Samarin made his debut at the Grand Prix series. He won the bronze medal at the 2017 Skate Canada and placed fourth at the 2017 Internationaux de France.

In December 2017, Samarin competed at the 2018 Russian Championships, where he won the silver medal behind Mikhail Kolyada. In January 2018, he competed at the 2018 European Championships, where he placed sixth, lower than countrymen Kolyada and Aliev.  He was consequently not named to the Russian Olympic team for the 2018 Winter Olympics, where there were only two men's spots.

2018–19 season
Samarin underwent knee surgery in May, was back on the ice in July, and started jumping again towards the end of August. Samarin started his season at the 2018 CS Ondrej Nepela Trophy where he finished fifth. In his Grand Prix events, he placed fourth at 2018 Skate Canada and won the bronze medal at 2018 Internationaux de France.

 In early December, Samarin competed at the 2018 CS Golden Spin of Zagreb where he won the bronze medal.

At the 2019 Russian Championships, Samarin placed fourth in the short program after falling on an attempted quad toe loop.  In the free skate, he fell on the quad toe but recovered to land six clean triples. He placed second and won the bronze medal overall.

In January 2019, he won the silver medal at the 2019 European Championships after placing second in both the short program and the free skate. Samarin landed a quad Lutz, quad toe, and six triple jumps in the free skate. His only major mistake was a two-footed triple loop. He achieved a new personal best score of 269.84 points and his first podium finish at a senior-level ISU Championship.

Samarin competed at the 2019 Winter Universiade, where he placed fourth. In March 2019, Samarin competed at the 2019 World Championships and placed twentieth in the short program, seventh in the free program, and twelfth overall. Samarin landed his first quad flip jump in competition.  He concluded the season as part of the Russian team at the 2019 World Team Trophy, where he placed last in the short program after falling on both quad attempts and performed better in the free skate.  Team Russia won the bronze medal overall.

2019–20 season
Samarin began the season with a fourth-place finish at the 2019 CS Ondrej Nepela Memorial before winning silver at the 2019 Shanghai Trophy.

On the Grand Prix, Samarin's first event was the 2019 Internationaux de France.  In the short program, Samarin placed second behind Nathan Chen, having made only a slight error on his triple Axel in a segment where most other competitors either popped or fell at least once. As a result, he was sixteen points ahead of the third-place Kévin Aymoz going into the free skate.  Samarin fell twice in the free skate, and finished third in that segment behind Chen and Aymoz, but won the silver medal overall.  At the 2019 Rostelecom Cup, Samarin placed first in the short program despite falling on his quad flip and putting a foot down on his triple Axel.  Narrowly first in the free skate as well, he became the first Russian man to win the Rostelecom Cup since Evgeni Plushenko in 2009, and qualified for the Grand Prix Final.  He finished fourth at the Final.

Samarin placed eighth in the short program at the 2020 Russian Championships after making errors on all three jumping passes and failing to complete his jump combination.  Third in the free skate despite two falls, he won the bronze medal.

Samarin was assigned to compete at the European Championships, where he performed poorly in the short program after underrotating his quad Lutz and falling on an attempted quad toe loop without executing a combination.  He was thirteenth in that segment.  The free skate was also a struggle, rising to tenth place overall.

2020–21 season
Samarin debuted his programs at the senior Russian test skates.  Competing on the domestic Cup of Russia series, he won the silver medal at the second stage in Moscow.  He subsequently injured his back and, as a result, withdrew from his scheduled second Cup of Russia event as well as the 2020 Rostelecom Cup.  After injuring his back, he contracted COVID-19 as well, though this was only a mild case.

Returning to competition at the 2021 Russian Championships, Samarin was fifth in the short program after falling on his quad Lutz and underrotating his triple Axel attempt. Sixth in the free skate, he remained in fifth place overall.

Samarin competed at the 2021 Channel One Trophy, a televised event organized in lieu of the cancelled European Championships. He was selected for the Time of Firsts team captained by Evgenia Medvedeva.  He placed sixth in both segments, and the Time of Firsts team finished in second place.  He did not participate in the Russian Cup Final.

2021–22 season
Samarin began the season with a bronze medal at the Budapest Trophy. Competing on the Grand Prix at the 2021 Skate Canada International, he placed eighth. He was sixth at 2021 NHK Trophy, his second Grand Prix, notably managing second place in the free skate. On the latter result, he said, "I'm happy about that, but I can still do better."

At the 2022 Russian Championships, Samarin finished in sixth place.

Records and achievements 
 The first European skater to have completed a quad Lutz in combination with a triple toe in international competition at the 2017 Skate Canada.

Programs

Competitive highlights 
GP: Grand Prix; CS: Challenger Series; JGP: Junior Grand Prix

Detailed results

Senior level 

Small medals for short and free programs awarded only at ISU Championships. At team events, medals awarded for team results only.

Junior level 

Small medals for short and free programs awarded only at ISU Championships.

References

External links 

 
 

1998 births
Russian male single skaters
European Figure Skating Championships medalists
World Junior Figure Skating Championships medalists
Living people
Figure skaters from Moscow
Competitors at the 2019 Winter Universiade